Major-General Sir John Samuel Jocelyn Percy, KBE, CB, CMG, DSO (9 March 1871 – 25 August 1952) was a British Army officer and Inspector General of the Royal Albanian Gendarmerie.

Percy was born in Gibraltar, the child of Edward Joscelyn Baumgartner (1815–1899), barrister and registrar of the Supreme Court of Gibraltar. The family later changed its name to Percy during the First World War, after the House of Percy to whom they were distantly related. He returned to England in 1884, and was educated at Queen Elizabeth's Grammar School in Sevenoaks and the Royal Military College, Sandhurst. He was commissioned into the East Lancashire Regiment in 1891.

After service in Ireland, Percy was posted to India and served in the 1894 Waziristan campaign and the 1895 Chitral Expedition. During the Second Boer War, he served in Robert's Horse. At Sanna's Post in 1900, he had his horse killed under him. He was mentioned in dispatches twice and promoted to brevet major.

During the First World War, Percy served in a number of staff positions, with the 27th, 48th, and 31st Divisions. Later, he was on the staff of the 11th Corps, the Fifth Army under General Gough, and the Second Army under General Plumer. For his wartime service, Percy was appointed CB, CMG, and DSO, mentioned in dispatches six times, was appointed a Commander of the French Order of the Légion d'honneur, of the Order of Leopold of Belgium, and of the Order of the Star of Romania, and received the Belgian Croix de guerre and the Order of the Sacred Treasure of Japan.

References 

 https://www.oxforddnb.com/view/10.1093/ref:odnb/9780198614128.001.0001/odnb-9780198614128-e-75539

1871 births
1952 deaths
Gibraltarians
British Army major generals
British Army generals of World War I
British expatriates in Albania
Knights Commander of the Order of the British Empire
Companions of the Order of the Bath
Companions of the Order of St Michael and St George
Companions of the Distinguished Service Order
East Lancashire Regiment officers
British Army personnel of the Second Boer War
British Army personnel of the Russian Civil War
British emigrants to Canada
British people of Swiss descent